Lawrence Pilut (born 30 December 1995) is a Swedish professional ice hockey defenceman who is currently playing for the Rochester Americans in the American Hockey League (AHL) while under contract to the Buffalo Sabres of the National Hockey League (NHL).

Playing career
Pilut began playing hockey as a youth in his hometown of Tingsryd and played at the under-18 level with Tingsryds AIF before transferring to HV71. Pilut made his Swedish Hockey League debut playing with HV71 during the 2013–14 season.

Pilut continued in the SHL with HV71 and in the 2017–18 season, he elevated his development to have a dominant season in contributing with 8 goals and 38 points in 52 games to be selected as the league's Defenceman of the Year.

In gaining NHL interest from his breakout season, Pilut left the SHL and signed as an undrafted free agent to a two-year, entry-level contract with the Buffalo Sabres on May 15, 2018. Pilut made his NHL debut on 30 November 2018, in a game against the Florida Panthers. On 8 January 2019, Pilut scored his first career NHL goal in a 5–1 win over the New Jersey Devils.

Pilut became a restricted free agent following the 2019–20 season. On 9 June 2020, he signed a two-year contract with Traktor Chelyabinsk of the Kontinental Hockey League (KHL).

After two successful seasons in the KHL with Chelyabinsk, Pilut returned to North America and the Sabres organization in agreeing to a one-year, two-way contract on 15 July 2022.

Personal life
Pilut lives in Jönköping with his girlfriend Linnéa Sjöbring.

Lawrence's father, Larry Pilut, is from the United States but spent most of his playing career in Sweden, including 14 seasons with Tingsryds AIF.

Career statistics

Regular season and playoffs

International

Awards and honors

References

External links

1995 births
Living people
Buffalo Sabres players
HV71 players
Rochester Americans players
Swedish ice hockey defencemen
Timrå IK players
Traktor Chelyabinsk players
Undrafted National Hockey League players
Swedish people of American descent